Mousa Refan also known as Akbar Refan, is an Iranian electrical engineer and former military officer.

In 2012 he was elected as the featured electrical engineer of Iran by Iran Academy of Science.

Early life and education 
Born in 1958 in Kazerun, Fars Province, Refan obtained his BS in electrical engineering from University of Tehran.

Military career 
Refan was one of the Muslim Student Followers of the Imam's Line taking over the U.S. embassy in 1979, who entered Islamic Revolutionary Guard Corps (IRGC) and reached at top of its command hierarchy. He was founder and the first commander of the IRGC's Air Force. Refan wanted to transform the military branch into a major aerial warfare force parallel to the regular air force. He resigned in 1990, reportedly due to what he deemed lack of sufficient support from IRGC leadership, according to Jamal S. Suwaidi.

Energy sector career 
Following departure from the IRGC, Refan entered MAPNA Group. He was manager and director of management committee of MAPNA for 17 years from its establishment to 2009.

Views 
According to the Israeli institute Intelligence and Terrorism Information Center, Refan is regarded a conservative figure within Iranian political spectrum.

References

Muslim Student Followers of the Imam's Line
Iranian electrical engineers
People from Kazerun
1958 births
Living people
Islamic Revolutionary Guard Corps personnel of the Iran–Iraq War